What a Night! is a 1931 British comedy crime film directed by Monty Banks and starring Leslie Fuller, Molly Lamont and Charles Paton. It was made at Elstree Studios as a quota quickie.

Premise
While staying at a reportedly haunted inn a traveler discovers that the 'ghost' is a thief.

Cast
 Leslie Fuller as Bill Grimshaw
 Molly Lamont as Nora Livingstone
 Charles Paton as Grindle
 Frank Stanmore as Mr Livingstone
 Syd Courtenay as Mr Merry
 Ernest Fuller as Landlord
 Molly Hamley-Clifford as Landlady
 Nina Olivette as Rose

References

Bibliography
 Chibnall, Steve. Quota Quickies: The Birth of the British 'B' Film. British Film Institute, 2007.
 Low, Rachael. Filmmaking in 1930s Britain. George Allen & Unwin, 1985.
 Wood, Linda. British Films, 1927-1939. British Film Institute, 1986.

External links

1931 films
Films shot at British International Pictures Studios
1930s English-language films
Films directed by Monty Banks
British crime comedy films
British black-and-white films
1930s crime comedy films
1931 comedy films
Quota quickies
1930s British films